was a Japanese athlete and the first Japanese Olympic gold medalist. He was the first Asian Olympic champion in an individual event.

Biography
Oda was born in Kaita, Hiroshima Prefecture. At the age of 17, he set a new Japanese record for the triple jump at the 1923 Far Eastern Championship Games held in Osaka, and also won the long jump and high jump events. He was selected as a member of the Japanese Olympic team for the 1924 Summer Olympics in Paris, participating in all three events. However, he failed to reach the semifinals in the long jump and high jump, and placed sixth in the triple jump competition.

On his return to Japan, he enrolled at Waseda University, but returned to compete in the 1928 Summer Olympics in Amsterdam. Although he again did not reach the semifinals in the long jump and high jump, he won the triple jump event with a result of 15.21 meters, becoming the first Japanese athlete to win an Olympic gold medal.

In 1931, Oda graduated from Waseda University and was employed by the Asahi Shimbun newspaper. On 27 October of the same year, he established a new world record for the triple jump of 15.58 meters. Oda served as coach and captain of the Japanese athletics team at the 1932 Summer Olympics in Los Angeles.

Upon retirement from competitive athletics, he focused his efforts on sports administration, becoming a member of the Japanese Olympic Committee in 1948 and later taking part in the IAAF's technical committee. He also served as coach for the Japanese athletics team at the 1952 Summer Olympics at Helsinki and the 1954 Asian Games in Manila. During the 1964 Summer Olympics in Tokyo, the Olympic flag was raised to a height of exactly 15.21 meters, to pay respect to Oda's achievement 36 years earlier.

Oda field, a 400-meter running track in Yoyogi built for the 1964 Olympics, was named after Oda. His sporting achievements were recognized with the creation of the Mikio Oda Memorial International Amateur Athletic Game, an annual track and field competition that has been held since 1967.

He became a professor at Waseda University from 1965. In 1976, Oda was awarded the Olympic Order, the highest award of the Olympic Movement. In 1988, Oda was honored by the government as a Person of Cultural Merit, and in 1989, he was named honorary chairman of the Japan Association of Athletics Federations. In the final years of his life, Oda moved from his home at Aburatsubo in Yokosuka, Kanagawa to a nursing home in Kugenuma (Fujisawa, Kanagawa). His grave is at the Buddhist temple of Tokei-ji in Kamakura.

In 2000, Oda was posthumously chosen as the best Asian male athlete of the century by a panel of track and field experts.

See also
List of Olympic medalists in athletics (men)
List of people on the postage stamps of Japan
List of flag bearers for Japan at the Olympics
List of Waseda University people

References

External links

Mikio Oda at olympic.org
Extensive interview with Oda

1905 births
1998 deaths
Sportspeople from Hiroshima Prefecture
Japanese male high jumpers
Japanese male long jumpers
Japanese male triple jumpers
Japanese decathletes
Olympic male high jumpers
Olympic male long jumpers
Olympic male triple jumpers
Olympic athletes of Japan
Olympic gold medalists for Japan
Olympic gold medalists in athletics (track and field)
Athletes (track and field) at the 1924 Summer Olympics
Athletes (track and field) at the 1928 Summer Olympics
Athletes (track and field) at the 1932 Summer Olympics
Medalists at the 1928 Summer Olympics
Japan Championships in Athletics winners
World record setters in athletics (track and field)
Recipients of the Medal with Purple Ribbon
Recipients of the Olympic Order
Waseda University alumni
The Asahi Shimbun people
Academic staff of Waseda University
20th-century Japanese people